Strong Women Strong Girls (SWSG) is a mentoring organization for girls in grades 3–5 with a focus on female empowerment and healthy habits. and with the goal of helping them to develop skills for lifelong success. The program was started by Lindsay Hyde while she was a high school senior in Miami, Florida and in 2000 when she moved to college, she expanded the program to be a student group at Harvard University. The mentoring began with six college-age women serving as mentors in two elementary schools.

The program expanded throughout the greater Boston, Massachusetts area and in 2004 was incorporated as a non-profit organization with Hyde as the organization's executive director. In 2006, SWSG launched programming in its first expansion community of Pittsburgh, Pennsylvania and a Miami initiative followed in 2009.

Jocelyn Horner was named CEO in 2017.

References

External links
swsg.org

Mentorships
Charities based in Massachusetts
Women's organizations based in the United States
Youth empowerment organizations